Demons Are a Girl's Best Friend may refer to:
Demons Are a Girl's Best Friend (album), 1996 studio album by Nekromantix
"Demons Are a Girl's Best Friend" (song), 2018 single by Powerwolf